Robert Charles Swenson (born July 1, 1953) played college football for the University of California.  He joined the National Football League (NFL) in 1975 as an undrafted free agent and played professional football as a linebacker for the Denver Broncos. Commenting on the draft for Sports Illustrated in 1978, Swenson said that "The draft is bull,... The scouts for most of the teams are 100 years old, and most of them don't know what they're doing. I went to school at Berkeley, and most of the NFL scouts think the students are still rioting in the streets out there. They didn't want to look at me."1

Swenson's career spanned eight seasons, from 1975 through 1983.  Swenson missed the 1980 season due to an injury.  Swenson was part of the famed Orange Crush Defense that propelled the Broncos to Super Bowl XII in January 1978, at the end of the 1977 season.  He was elected to the Pro Bowl after the 1981 season.

External links
pro-football-reference.com Bob Swenson
Football database - Bob Swenson

1953 births
Living people
Players of American football from Stockton, California
American football linebackers
California Golden Bears football players
Denver Broncos players
American Conference Pro Bowl players